Daniel McManus (born 9 July 2003) is a Scottish professional footballer who plays as a midfielder for East Kilbride. On 22 December 2021, McManus was temporarily recalled from his loan spell and made his debut for St Mirren as an 88th minute substitute in a 0–0 draw with Celtic. He was later quoted as saying it was "surreal going from watching them on TV to playing against them." McManus returned for the rest of the season on loan to East Kilbride. On 1 July 2022, he signed a permanent deal with East Kilbride.

References

2003 births
Living people
Scottish footballers
St Mirren F.C. players
Scottish Professional Football League players
Association football midfielders